Ian Roger Hagemoen (December 4, 1940 – ) was a Canadian football player who played for the BC Lions, Edmonton Eskimos and Saskatchewan Roughriders. He won the Grey Cup with the Lions in 1964. His death was announced on October 17, 2009.

References

1940 births
2009 deaths
Players of Canadian football from British Columbia
BC Lions players
Edmonton Elks players
Saskatchewan Roughriders players
People from the Cariboo Regional District